U.S. Route 395 (US 395) is a U.S. Route in the western United States. The southern terminus of the route is in the Mojave Desert at Interstate 15 near Hesperia. The northern terminus is at the Canada–US border near Laurier, where the road becomes Highway 395 upon entering British Columbia, Canada. Before 1964, the route extended south to San Diego. I-15, I-215, and California State Route 163 replaced the stretch of 395 that ran from San Diego to Hesperia through Riverside and San Bernardino. "Old Highway 395" can be seen along or near I-15 in many locations before it branches off at Hesperia to head north. It has also been referred to as the "Three Flags Route."

The route runs through the U.S. states of California, Nevada, Oregon, and Washington. Major cities US 395 connects to include Hesperia, California, Carson City and Reno, Nevada, and Kennewick, Pasco, and Spokane, Washington.

US 395 runs along the Eastern Sierra in the Owens Valley and crosses through the Modoc Plateau along its routing in California.

The route started out as a spur of U.S. Route 195 and ran north from Spokane. As a result, the route never intersects its parent, U.S. Route 95; it maintains a connection through US 195. US 395 developed into a parallel of its parent route when extended south in the early 1930s. US 395 stays west of its parent route, which runs through Arizona, California, Nevada, Oregon and Idaho.

Route description

Southern California

US 395 begins in the Mojave Desert community of Hesperia at the junction with Interstate 15 (I-15). The highway proceeds north across the Mojave Desert crossing State Route 58 (SR 58) at Kramer Junction just east of the town of Boron. Several large solar generating fields are sited at Kramer Junction. The highway continues north until merging with SR 14, which used to be the south end of a concurrent run with US 6. From here to Bishop the highway follows the eastern escarpment of the Sierra Nevada mountain range. For most of this run the highway is also routed through the Owens Valley.

After Bishop the scenery dramatically changes as the highway ascends the Sierra Nevada, serving the ski resort town of Mammoth Lakes, California and Mammoth Mountain as well as Mono Lake and June Lake. The highway exits California at Topaz Lake to serve the Reno, Nevada metropolitan area.

Nevada

US 395 in Nevada is a major highway, the majority of which is now or is scheduled to be upgraded to Interstate Highway standards. The portion from Carson City to Reno is signed as and concurrent with I-580. The highway follows the eastern edge of the Sierra Nevada as it travels between its southern and northern California segments.

US 395 enters Nevada at Topaz Lake then descends to Carson Valley, where it becomes the primary street through Gardnerville, Minden and Carson City. Entering Reno, the highway is designated, since 1998, as the Martin Luther King Jr. Freeway. US 395 returns to California just north of Reno at the unincorporated Nevada community of Bordertown, in Cold Springs, Washoe County.

Northern California
The highway returns to California just north of Reno. This northern piece also follows the Sierra Nevada. It passes near the town of Susanville, cutting abruptly to the east after it meets with SR 36 near Johnstonville, then passes through Alturas. US 395 also serves several points of interest along this portion, such as Hallelujah Junction, Honey Lake, and the Modoc Plateau.

Oregon

US 395 enters Oregon at New Pine Creek, then heads north to Lakeview. At Valley Falls, it turns northeast through Wagontire to Riley. Near Riley, US 395 overlaps US 20 through Hines and Burns. At John Day, it overlaps US 26 and heads west to Mount Vernon. At Mount Vernon, US 395 turns north through Long Creek and Pilot Rock to Pendleton. At Pendleton, it overlaps I-84 and US 30 west to Stanfield. At Stanfield, US 395 turns north through Hermiston to Umatilla. East of Umatilla, it overlaps US 730 and heads west to I-82. It then overlaps I-82 to the Washington state line at the Columbia River.

The entire route within Oregon was designated as the World War I Veterans Memorial Highway in 2015.

Washington

US  395 enters Washington with I-82 over the Columbia River. At exit 113, US  395 splits from I-82, entering the Tri-Cities area. After departing the freeway, it passes residential areas south of Kennewick. After that there is a stoplight at 27th Avenue. The next major intersection is at 10th next to Fred Meyer, then at West Kennewick Avenue, followed by the intersections at West Clearwater Avenue and North Yelm Street, then heads toward the Columbia River. It then passes over the Columbia River as the Blue Bridge with a view of the Cable Bridge (SR 397) to the east as it proceeds toward I-182/US  12. The Blue Bridge has frequent traffic backups, especially during rush hour. US  395 joins I-182 for a short distance to Pasco, where it separates from the freeway. Past I-182, it passes the Tri-Cities Airport before resuming a north–south direction at the Oregon Avenue interchange. Outside of Pasco, US  395 crosses through farmland and little towns until it combines with I-90 at the town of Ritzville, Washington. From there it goes to Spokane and merges with US 2 as they enter the city. The concurrent highways meet US 195 at its northern terminus. US 2 and US 395 split from I-90 at the Division Street exit.

US 395 currently runs north on Division Street to travel through Spokane. The Washington State Department of Transportation (WSDOT) is constructing the US 395 North Spokane Corridor, which is a completely new freeway that will run from I-90 (around the Thor/Freya exit) northward to the existing US 395 north of Wandermere. Construction on the new freeway began between Wandermere and Francis in 2003. The freeway will take many years to complete due to funding issues. When the North Spokane Corridor is complete, US 395 will move to the new alignment while US 2 will stay on Division Street.

US 395 (along with US 2) proceeds north through Spokane as Division Street to the north edge of the city where they split; US 2 heading northeast to Idaho. US 395 then proceeds north through the towns of Deer Park, Clayton, Chewelah, Colville and Kettle Falls. It terminates at the Canada–US border where it meets British Columbia Highway 395.

History

California
US Highway 395 once extended to 11th and Ash in downtown San Diego. This part of the highway is now the alignments of Interstate 15 from Hesperia to Devore and Interstate 215 from Devore, through San Bernardino, Grand Terrace, Riverside, Moreno Valley, Perris, and Menifee to Murrieta where it meets Interstate 15 again.  From Murrieta the old route follows Interstate 15 again to east of Fallbrook where the original US 395 still exists as a frontage road.  "Old US 395" can be followed from north of State Route 76 through Escondido where it meets Interstate 15 again.  Finally, State Route 163, the old routing of US 395, splits off Interstate 15 at the south end of Miramar and follows the Cabrillo Freeway into downtown San Diego.

Oregon and Washington

In 1926, US 395 was a spur of US 195. It started in Spokane and traveled northwest to British Columbia. As a result, it never intersected its parent, US 95; US 195 always provided the connection. US 395 developed into a parallel of its parent route when it was extended south through Oregon in 1935. In Oregon, it replaced most of Oregon Highway 11.

Originally, US 395 didn't travel concurrently with I-82, or I-84. US 395 went north from Pendleton to Cold Springs Junction, currently Oregon Route 37. From there, US 395 traveled concurrently with US 730 and US 410 (until US 410 became US 12), passing through Wallula to enter Pasco from the southeast. The concurrency with I-84 and rerouting through Hermiston was made in 1972. The overlap with I-82 and rerouting through Kennewick was made in 1984.  Also noteworthy, the US 395 route north of Pasco at Eltopia to Connell was relocated in 1980 from what is now known as Blanton Road, to a route further west that offered greater expansion into a divided 4-lane highway.  Today, the entire route of US 395 from Pasco to Ritzville, WA is four lane divided, but still with farm road crossings in places.

Major intersections
Southern California
  in Hesperia
  in Bishop
Nevada
  in Carson City. The highways travel concurrently through Carson City.
  in Carson City. I-580/US 395 travels concurrently to Reno.
  in Reno
Northern California
 No major intersections
Oregon
  in Riley. The highways travel concurrently to northeast of Burns.
  in John Day. The highways travel concurrently to Mount Vernon.
  in Pendleton. The highways travel concurrently to Stanfield.
  in Pendleton. The highways travel concurrently to Stanfield.
  in Umatilla. The highways travel concurrently through Umatilla.
  in Umatilla. I-82/US 395 travels concurrently to Kennewick, Washington.
Washington
  in Pasco. The highways travel concurrently through Pasco.
  south of Ritzville. The highways travel concurrently to Spokane.
  in Spokane. The highways travel concurrently to the Spokane–Town and Country line.
  in Spokane
  at the Canada–US border in Laurier

See also

Jane Kim (artist) for information about the Migrating Mural on Route 395, spanning 120 miles

References

External links

Endpoints of US highway 395
The Three Flags Highway: US 395 at Floodgap Roadgap

 
95-3
95-3